Monotropastrum is a small genus of myco-heterotrophic plants in the family Ericaceae. As currently circumscribed the group includes two species.

Distribution
The genus is found locally throughout much of southern and eastern Asia (Bhutan, China, India, Indonesia, Japan, Korea, Laos, Myanmar, Nepal, Russia, Sikkim, Thailand, and Vietnam).

Taxonomy
Based on morphological and molecular analyses, Monotropastrum has been placed in the Ericaceae subfamily Monotropoideae, and the tribe Monotropeae.

List of species
Monotropastrum humile (D.Don) H.Hara
Monotropastrum sciaphilum (Andres) G.D. Wallace

References

External links
Monotropastrum at The Plant List
Monotropastrum at the Encyclopedia of Life
Monotropastrum at the online Flora of China

Monotropoideae
Ericaceae genera